The Show Chart is a music program record chart on SBS MTV that gives an award to the best-performing single of the week in South Korea.

In 2021, 32 singles ranked number one on the chart and 26 music acts received an award trophy for this feat. "After Midnight" by Astro achieved the highest score of the year on episode 271 with 9,520 points.

Chart history

References 

2021 in South Korean music
2021 record charts
Lists of number-one songs in South Korea